saThe 2011 season was the tenth for the  HTC–Highroad Women cycling team, which began as the T-Mobile team in 2003. The main new riders for the team were the Americans Amber Neben and Amanda Miller and the German time trial champion Charlotte Becker. In January, Carla Swart died whilst training after being hit by a truck. After winning a stage, Ellen van Dijk won the Ladies Tour of Qatar which was the 400th victory for the team (men's and women's) since 2008. Ina Teutenberg won the fifth round in the Women's World Cup and the team won the seventh round, the Open de Suède Vårgårda team time trial. The team finished second overall in the World Cup. Judith Arndt finished fourth in the individual standings and Teutenberg fifth. At the end of the season Arndt took the third place in the UCI World Ranking, Teutenberg fourth and the team ended in second place in the team classification.

Roster

Riders who joined the team for the 2011 season

Riders who left the team during or after the 2010 season

Season

February 

The season started for the team with the Ladies Tour of Qatar in February. In stage 2, Ellen van Dijk was part of the front group and took home the stage victory by winning the sprint. The day afterwards she defended successfully her leading position in the general classification and won the points classification as well. Van Dijk dedicated her victories to Carla Swart who died whilst training after being hit by a truck a few weeks earlier. The prize money she earned in Qatar was sent to her family. Van Dijk's victory was the 400th victory for the team (men's and women's) since 2008.

March–July

End of July – August 
In late July the team won the world cup team time trial, the 2011 Open de Suède Vårgårda TTT and was over a minute faster than Team AA Drink. The team consisted of: Ellen van Dijk, Judith Arndt, Amber Neben and Charlotte Becker. The day afterwards was the World Cup road race in Sweden, the 2011 Open de Suède Vårgårda. Ellen van Dijk won the sprint of the peloton and finished second behind Annemiek van Vleuten, who had a small gap with the bunch. Teutenberg finished fourth.

Teutenberg won the first stage of the Trophée d'Or Féminin by winning the sprint and the team won the team time trial afterwards. Becker won the third stage. The leaders jersey was lost to Tatiana Antoshina after the fourth stage. In the fifth stage Teutenberg won the bunch sprint behind a breakaway of four riders. In the last stage Becker finished fourth but did not win enough time to win the overall classification and finished second.

September 
At the Profile Ladies Tour, Ina Teutenberg finished second in the first stage. The day afterwards Ellen van Dijk won for the third consecutive year the time trial stage of this tour. At the same time the Tour Cycliste Féminin International de l'Ardèche took place. Emilia Fahlin won the prologue and the day afterwards the time trial as well. She lost however thirteen minutes on Emma Pooley in the thirds stage. Evelyn Stevens won stage 4 with over a four minutes lead over teammate Amanda Miller. Fahlin won the two stages afterwards. After finishing again second in the time trial, Miller finished fourth in the general classification.

In preparation for the time trial world championships, Arndt won the Chrono Champenois just ahead of Amber Neben.

At the Giro della Toscana Int. Femminile the team won once again the team time trial. Arndt won the sprint of the second stage and took the leaders jersey. The stage afterwards the team provided Arndt on the final climb with a train so she could also win that stage. After Teutenberg won the stage afterwards and Arndt the time trial the next morning the team booked five consecutive victories. In the fourth stage where Teutenberg abandoned, Megan Guarnier took the lead. In the fifth stage also Teutenberg abandoned. In the last stage Charlotte Becker won the stage by winning the bunch sprint.

End of September: UCI Road World Championships 
Judith Arndt won, at the age of 35, the time trial at the UCI Road World Championships. Linda Villumsen won the silver medal, Emma Pooley finished third. Ina Teutenberg won bronze in the road race and Chloe Hosking finished sixth.

October – December 
To the end of the road cycling season, Amber Neben won the Chrono des Nations in October.

At the Dutch National Track Championships in December, Ellen van Dijk won two national titles. She won the individual pursuit as well as the madison.

Results

Season victories

Results in major races

Single day races
Judith Arndt finished 4th in the final classification and Ina-Yoko Teutenberg 5th. The team finished 2nd in the teams standing.

Grand Tours

UCI World Ranking

The team finished second in the UCI ranking for teams.

References

2011 UCI Women's Teams seasons
2011 in American sports
Velocio–SRAM Pro Cycling